The 1984 Roger et Gallet Cup was a men's tennis tournament played on outdoor clay courts in Florence, Italy that was part of the 1984 Volvo Grand Prix circuit. It was the 12th edition of the tournament and was played from 7 May until 13 May 1984. Seventh-seeded Francesco Cancellotti won the singles title.

Finals

Singles
 Francesco Cancellotti defeated  Jimmy Brown 6–1, 6–4
 It was Cancellotti's first singles title of his career.

Doubles
 Mark Dickson /  Chip Hooper defeated  Bernard Mitton /  Butch Walts 7–6, 4–6, 7–5

References

External links
 ITF tournament edition details

Alitalia Florence Open
Alitalia Florence Open
Tennis tournaments in Italy